"It's Been a Long, Long Time" is a big band-era song that was a hit at the end of World War II, with music by Jule Styne and lyrics by Sammy Cahn.

Background

The lyrics are written from the perspective of a person welcoming home their spouse at the end of the war.

Popular recordings
The most popular recording, by trumpeter Harry James and His Orchestra with vocalist Kitty Kallen, debuted in October 1945 on Billboard's Best-Selling Popular Retail Records chart and reached number one in the chart dated November 24, 1945 – the last of Harry James's nine US number ones. The record features a solo by alto saxophonist Willie Smith.

A hit version by iconic crooner Bing Crosby with Les Paul and His Trio (recorded on July 12, 1945) debuted the same week as James's record, which it replaced at number one in the chart dated December 8, 1945. Sammy Kaye's "Chickery Chick" then returned to number one, only to be replaced by the Harry James recording, which reclaimed the top spot (for one final week) in the chart dated December 22. James's and Crosby's hits remained on the chart for 17 and 16 weeks, respectively. Both versions reached number one on Billboard'''s Records Most-Played on the Air chart and its Most-Played Juke Box Records chart.

Two other recordings of "It's Been a Long, Long Time" charted in America in late 1945: Charlie Spivak and His Orchestra with vocal by Irene Daye (US no. 4) and Stan Kenton and His Orchestra with vocal by June Christy (US no. 6).

"It's Been a Long, Long Time" topped Billboard's composite Honor Roll of Hits chart for the last seven weeks of 1945.

Les Paul recalled in an interview for Mojo magazine that "Bing was a sucker for guitar and that particular song was a case of you don't have to play a lot of notes, you just have to play the right notes."

The song became a standard with versions recorded by The DeMarco Sisters (1945), June Haver and Dan Dailey (1950), Perry Como (1956), Al Hibbler (1956), Peggy Lee (1959), Keely Smith (1959), Louis Armstrong (1964), and Tom Jones (1966). In 1945 Frank Sinatra sang a version on the radio show Your Hit Parade, and this recording has appeared on many compilation albums. Harry James and His Orchestra re-recorded the song with singer Helen Forrest.

Other notable recordings
Others who have recorded it include Doris Day (on her 1965 album Doris Day's Sentimental Journey), Guy Mitchell, Sammy Cahn, Shelley Fabares (on her 1962 album Shelley!), Sammy Kaye, The Ink Spots, Pentatonix, Tina Louise, Jimmy Roselli, Brook Benton, Judy Kuhn, Rosemary Clooney, Chet Atkins with Les Paul (on their 1976 album Chester and Lester), Brent Spiner (on his 1991 album Ol' Yellow Eyes Is Back) and Pete Fountain (on his 1966 album A Taste of Honey).

Uses in popular culture
The Harry James recording (vocals by Kitty Kallen) features in two films in the Marvel Cinematic Universe, notable as a tragically ironic piece of music representing Steve Rogers/Captain America (Chris Evans) and his best friend James "Bucky" Barnes (Sebastian Stan) and later with love interest Peggy Carter (Hayley Atwell) being torn apart by time. It was first used in Captain America: The Winter Soldier (2014), when Nick Fury (Samuel L. Jackson) is hiding in Steve's apartment after an assassination attempt by HYDRA agents in the streets of Washington DC, before being shot by the Winter Soldier; representing the first instance in which Steve Rogers is reunited with his childhood best friend and companion Bucky Barnes since their separation during World War II (despite the identities of both men not being known to the other). It was then used at the end of Avengers: Endgame (2019) when Steve travels back in time and chooses to live out his life with Peggy. The two share a slow dance to the song – a reference to the dance date Rogers promised Carter right before he was lost in ice for 70 years in Captain America: The First Avenger (2011). The song also plays during the Marvel Studios intro in "For All Time. Always.", the sixth episode of the Disney+ series Loki (2021).
The Harry James recording features briefly in the beginning of the movie Red Tails (2012),  which is about an all African-American team of fighter pilots during World War II.

References

Sources
Grudens, Richard (2002). Bing Crosby: Crooner of the Century. Celebrity Profiles Publishing Co. .
Macfarlane, Malcolm. Bing Crosby: Day By Day. Scarecrow Press, 2001.
Osterholm, J. Roger. Bing Crosby: A Bio-Bibliography.'' Greenwood Press, 1994.

1940s jazz standards
1945 songs
Al Hirt songs
1945 singles
Bing Crosby songs
Brook Benton songs
Chet Atkins songs
Decca Records singles
Frank Sinatra songs
Guy Mitchell songs
Louis Armstrong songs
Peggy Lee songs
Perry Como songs
Pop standards
Rosemary Clooney songs
Shelley Fabares songs
Songs of World War II
Songs with lyrics by Sammy Cahn
Songs with music by Jule Styne
Tom Jones (singer) songs